Aelurillus kronestedti is a species of spider of the genus Aelurillus. It is native to India and Sri Lanka.

References

Salticidae
Spiders described in 2004
Spiders of Asia
Arthropods of Sri Lanka